Henry Huth (born c. 1939) is a former Canadian football player who played for the Edmonton Eskimos and Calgary Stampeders. He played junior football with the Vancouver Blue Bombers.

References

1930s births
Living people
Canadian football running backs
Edmonton Elks players
Calgary Stampeders players